Si Xianmin (born November 1957) is a former Chinese business executive who served as chairman and general manager of China Southern Airlines, the world's sixth-largest airline measured by passengers carried and Asia's largest airline in fleet size and passengers carried. Si Xiamin spent more than 20 years in China Southern Airlines. He was a delegate to the 12th National People's Congress. In November 2015, he was placed under investigation by the Chinese Communist Party's anti-corruption agency. He is the first head of civil aviation in China implicated since the beginning of Xi Jinping's anti-corruption drive after he took power in late 2012.

Biography

Career
Born in November 1957, Si Xianmin graduated from the School of Economics and Management, Tsinghua University as well as Civil Aviation Flight University of China.

Beginning in 1975, he worked in China's civil aviation field. In 1992 he entered China Southern Airlines, China's largest airline by passenger traffic, he served as its deputy director and then director of Henan Branch Office, he remained in that position until 1998, when he was transferred to southwest China's Guizhou province and appointed the party boss and deputy general manager of Guizhou Branch Office. In 2000 he was transferred again to Guangzhou, capital of Guangdong province, he was elevated to deputy party boss of China Southern Airlines, a position he held until 2003. He was promoted to party boss of its North Branch in 2003, and held that office until October 2004. Then he was promoted again to become its general manager, and he concurrently served as its chairman in January 2009.

Downfall
Between 26 November 2014 to 30 December 2014, the first team the Communist Party of China's (CPC) top discipline watchdog were tipped off about suspected violations during their checks of China Southern Airlines. It was not long before the company's three deputy general managers Chen Gang, Xu Jiebo, Zhou Yuehai and operation director Tian Xiaodong were sacked for graft.

On November 4, 2015, "Si Xianmin has come under investigation for serious violations of discipline", Central Commission for Discipline Inspection (CCDI), the party's anti-graft watchdog said in a statement on its website, without elaborating.

On February 3, 2016, Si Xianmin was expelled from the Communist Party. The investigation concluded that Si violated Eight-point Regulation, played golf with public funds, accepted bribes etc.

On April 28, 2017, Si Xianmin was sentenced to 10 years and 6 months in prison for taking bribes worth 7.89 million yuan (~$1.14 million) in Shenzhen People's Intermediate Court.

References

1957 births
Living people
Civil Aviation Flight University of China alumni
Tsinghua University alumni
Businesspeople from Henan
Chinese aviation businesspeople
People from Pingdingshan
Expelled members of the Chinese Communist Party
Chinese politicians convicted of corruption